Sizzler USA Restaurants, Inc., doing business as Sizzler, is a United States-based restaurant chain with headquarters in Mission Viejo, California, with locations mainly in California, plus some in the nearby states of Washington, Arizona, Nevada, New Mexico, Idaho, Utah, Oregon and Puerto Rico. It is known for steak, seafood, and salad bar items.

Since 2011, Sizzler restaurants outside of the United States are currently owned by Australia-based Collins Foods and are no longer related to the American firm.

In September 2020, Sizzler USA, filed for Chapter 11 bankruptcy due to the COVID-19 pandemic hurting sales. The bankruptcy filing does not affect the similarly named Collins Foods affiliated restaurants that are located outside of the United States.

History

The chain was founded in 1958 as Sizzler Family Steak House by Del and Helen Johnson in Culver City, California. At its peak, the chain was composed of more than 270 locations throughout the U.S. Most of Sizzler's U.S. locations are in the West.

In the late 1970s and early 1980s, Sizzler promoted steak and combination steak dinners with an optional salad bar. The restaurant wanted to give customers the feel of a full-service restaurant at a price slightly more than a fast food chain. To control costs, many restaurants had in-house meat cutters that would cut steaks and grind beef.

Into the early to mid 1980s, competition appeared: Ponderosa Steakhouse and Bonanza Steakhouse. After promotions, such as all-you-can-eat fried shrimp, the chain expanded its salad bar into a full buffet promoted as the "Buffet Court." Patrons began to use the buffet as a meal instead of an add-on to an entree. In response, Sizzler lowered the quality in other menu areas. Sizzler also introduced a free grilled cheese bread roll at the start of the experience which was intended to line the stomach, curbing appetite. Customers took notice, and Sizzler's reputation suffered.

Sizzler filed for Chapter 11 bankruptcy in 1996 ("to escape costly leases on unprofitable restaurants"), and closed over 130 of its locations. The company reemerged from Chapter 11 in 1997. During the late 1990s, new management upgraded the quality of food and increased prices. Twenty one locations closed in 2001. Sizzler began an image makeover circa 2002. A new restaurant concept was created, featuring a lighter and more open dining room. The changes were accompanied by a new menu. In an effort to return to its roots, Sizzler emphasized steaks, seafood, and the salad bar. While the all-you-can-eat buffet was phased out in some locations, it remained in many others.

In the 1990s, Sizzler ran upscale locations with the Buffalo Ranch Steakhouse brand.

Sizzler was sold to Pacific Equity Partners, an Australian-based investment firm, in 2005. In January 2008, Sizzler announced it was planning to take action against the Multi-State Lottery Association (MUSL) of Urbandale, Iowa, over the use of the name The Sizzler (Hot Lotto).

In June 2011, Sizzler USA announced that a US management group led by the Sizzler CEO would buy the American portion of the chain of 178 restaurants from Pacific Equity Partners with the remaining 100 restaurants located outside of the United States remaining with Pacific Equity Partners. The headquarters initially remained in Culver City, California, where the chain was founded, but moved to Mission Viejo, California, in 2012.

Sizzler has launched its "ZZ" food truck to expand sales and test market new dishes.

In September 2020, Sizzler USA announced that they had filed for Chapter 11 bankruptcy protection, citing impacts of the COVID-19 pandemic, namely forcing it to temporarily close its restaurants' dining rooms. The company also cited problems paying rent. Most of the company-owned restaurants are located in highly COVID-19 infected areas of California that did not even permit restaurants to partially open dining rooms as recently as September 2020. At the time of the bankruptcy filing, Sizzler had 107 locations in 10 states, with all but one location in Florida in states west of the Rocky Mountains in addition to several locations in Puerto Rico. This number is down from the 134 locations in 2018.

International locations

After Sizzler USA's separation from Sizzler International in 2011, all locations outside the United States are operated or licensed by Australia-based Collins Foods. Under Collins, Sizzler International currently has restaurants in Japan and Thailand.

Australia
The first Australian Sizzler steakhouse was opened in Brisbane in 1985. The steakhouses in Australia were reasonably popular during the 1990s. In the 2013 financial year, Collins Foods reported stalling revenue for their Sizzler operations in Australia, blaming the downturn of the casual dining sector in the country.

By 2015, Collins Foods wrote down the value of Sizzler by AU$37.5 million. In an investors meeting by Collins Foods, CEO Graham Maxwell states: "We no longer consider Sizzler to be a strategic growth prospect in Australia and therefore we will not be investing further capital". Collins Foods began to close a number of Sizzler restaurants in Australia. Meanwhile, Collins Foods' Sizzler operations in Asia continued to thrive, with further expansion planned in China.

Collins Foods closed all of its remaining Sizzler restaurants in Australia in November 2020. Collins Foods said of the three restaurant brands that it operates, Sizzler had been hardest hit by the COVID-19 pandemic. Although Collins had closed all company-owned restaurants in 2020, Collins continues to license the use of the Sizzler restaurant brand for use in Thailand and Japan.

Current locations

Japan
The current Sizzler franchise-holder in Japan is Royal Holdings Co., Ltd., a Fukuoka-based food service company. Royal Holdings opened the first Japanese Sizzler steakhouse in 1991. By August 2021, Royal Holdings had 10 Sizzler restaurants in Japan.

Thailand
The current Sizzler franchise-holder in Thailand is Minor Food Group via a subsidiary called SLRT Limited. Minor opened its first Thai Sizzler steakhouse in 1996. By 2001, Minor had 19 Sizzler restaurants throughout Thailand.

During the COVID-19 pandemic, the company experimented with the use of robotic waiters in the dining room in December 2020 to minimize physical contact between customers and restaurant staff. After the Thai government loosen COVID-19 dine-in restrictions in September 2021, Sizzler Thailand was able to reopen 54 out of a total of 60 restaurants for dine-in. Two months after reopening, the Thai franchise announced expansion plans of trying to open new 3-5 restaurants per year over the next three years. The franchise also announced plans of installing more robot food delivery systems within each restaurant which would minimize human contact between dine-in customers and the restaurant staff which would in turn lessen the transmission of COVID and other diseases.

Former locations

China
According to archived snapshots of the official Sizzler China website, the Thailand-based Minor Food Group had seven Sizzler restaurants in China from May 2009 and November 2012.

Singapore
According to archived snapshots of the official Sizzler Singapore website, Collins had three Sizzler restaurants in Singapore in December 2001. In March 2013, the company had two Sizzler restaurants in Singapore.

Controversy

Food safety
In 2000, more than 60 people became ill and one person died in an outbreak of E. coli O157:H7 that originated at a Sizzler restaurant in Milwaukee, Wisconsin. Health officials said that the most likely source of contamination was meat supplied by the Excel Corporation meat packer.  The health officials believed that cross contamination to other food items occurred when Sizzler employees handled the meat near areas where salad bar items were prepared.  This was similar to an outbreak in Washington and Oregon in 1993.  In the 1993 case, as in 2000, the tainted meat apparently came from Excel and contaminated salad bar items. This ultimately led to Sizzler closing the chain's remaining Midwest locations, including those in Wisconsin, Illinois, and Indiana.

See also

List of buffet restaurants
List of casual dining restaurant chains

References

External links

 

Mission Viejo, California
Companies based in Orange County, California
Restaurants in Greater Los Angeles
Economy of the Western United States
Regional restaurant chains in the United States
Restaurant chains in the United States
1958 establishments in California
Companies that filed for Chapter 11 bankruptcy in 1996
Companies that filed for Chapter 11 bankruptcy in 2020
Restaurants established in 1958
Steakhouses in the United States
Buffet restaurants
2005 mergers and acquisitions